The 1999 MAC men's basketball tournament, a part of the 1998–99 NCAA Division I men's basketball season, took place at SeaGate Centre in Toledo, Ohio.  It was a single-elimination tournament with three rounds and included only the top eight conference teams. The quarterfinal round was held on the campus sites of the top four seeds, and the winners advanced to play the semifinal and final rounds in Toledo. It was the final Mid-American Conference men's basketball tournament that did not include all conference members, and the final tournament held in Toledo. Miami, the MAC regular season winner, received the number one seed in the tournament. Second-seeded Kent State won the tournament with a 49–43 win over Miami and received the Mid-American Conference's automatic bid to the 1999 NCAA tournament. It was Kent State's first MAC Tournament win and marked their first appearance in the NCAA Tournament. Miami was selected as an at-large entry for the NCAA Tournament. Through the 2016–17 season, it is the most recent time the MAC has had more than one team participate in the NCAA Tournament.

Tournament

Seeds
 Miami
 Kent State
 Ohio
 Akron
 Bowling Green
 Toledo
 Marshall
 Ball State

Bracket 

* – Denotes overtime period

References 

Mid-American Conference men's basketball tournament
Tournament
MAC men's basketball tournament